Jacquard may refer to:

People
 Albert Jacquard (1925-2013), French geneticist and essayist
 Joseph Marie Jacquard (1752-1834), French weaver and inventor of the Jacquard loom
 Robert Jacquard (born 1958), American politician

Other uses
 A M Jacquard Systems, former American manufacturer of small office computer systems
 Project Jacquard, a series of smart textile technologies by Google Advanced Technology and Projects

See also
 Jacquard loom, a power loom attachment that allows the manufacture of intricate patterns
 Jaccard (disambiguation)

Surnames of French origin